DS4Ever (stylized in all caps and alternatively titled Drip Season 4Ever) is the third studio album by American rapper Gunna. It was released on January 7, 2022, by YSL Records and 300 Entertainment. The album features guest appearances from Future, Young Thug, 21 Savage, Drake, Kodak Black, Chlöe, Lil Baby, G Herbo, Nechie, Yung Bleu, Chris Brown, and Roddy Ricch. It serves as the fourth and final installment of Gunna's Drip Season series, following Drip Season 3 released in 2018.

Despite receiving mixed reviews from music critics, DS4Ever performed well commercially, debuting atop the US Billboard 200 with 150,000 album-equivalent units of which 4,000 were pure sales, making for Gunna's second number-one album.

Release and promotion
On January 1, 2022, Gunna revealed the album's release date. The cover art, which was created by American architect Daniel Arsham, was revealed on January 4. It was followed by the tracklist, which was shared the following day.

The album's lead single, "Too Easy", a collaboration with fellow American rapper Future, was released on September 24, 2021. The remix, which includes an additional feature from fellow American rapper Roddy Ricch, was released on December 3, 2021. The music video for the remix was released on January 7, 2022. "Too Easy" peaked at number 16 on the US Billboard Hot 100.

A music video for the song "Livin Wild" was released on January 10, 2022, while the music video for "Pushin P" with Future featuring Young Thug, was released on January 12. The songs peaked at number 61 and seven on the Billboard Hot 100, respectively.

On January 13, 2022, "P Power" (originally titled "Pussy Power"), a collaboration with fellow rapper Drake, was added to the album. The song peaked at number 24 on the Billboard Hot 100.

Critical reception

DS4Ever was met with mixed reviews. At Metacritic, which assigns a normalized rating out of 100 to reviews from professional publications, the album received an average score of 51, based on five reviews.

Michael Di Gennaro from Exclaim! enjoyed the album, saying, "DS4Ever is certainly a good mainstream rap record, and fans of Gunna and the community of high-profile Atlanta artists he's aligned with will find plenty to enjoy across the album's 19 tracks". Armon Sadler of HipHopDX said, "DS4Ever is proof he presumably won't allow stardom to make him complacent, balancing improvements in song topics and technical skill, even if the drip talk has gone stale". In a lukewarm review, Rolling Stones Mosi Reeves wrote, "Gunna has a flashy and intoxicating vocal style, and that alone [makes] DS4 a worthy escapade. But he can't transcend the clichés that define his era".

Reviewing the album for AllMusic, David Crone stated, "After tunnelling into a very specific avenue for Wunna, DS4 loses focus, instead spreading the rapper thin across a much wider smattering of styles. The resulting project feels noncommittal: DS4 is caught between the woozy, floating sounds of Wunna and an older, heavier-hitting sound, yet nails neither". Pitchfork critic Alphonse Pierre said, "The Atlanta rapper's latest album is monotonous, short on the quirks and out-of-body experiences of his better projects".

Commercial performance
DS4Ever debuted atop the US Billboard 200 with 150,000 album-equivalent units comprising 193.5 million on-demand streams and 4,000 pure sales, making it Gunna's second number-one album. The album notably blocked the Weeknd's album Dawn FM from the top spot by approximately 2,300 units.

Track listing

Notes
 "Pushin P" is stylized as "pushin P".
 "P Power" is stylized as "P power".
 All other tracks are stylized in all lowercase. For example, "Private Island" is stylized as "private island".

Sample credits
 "P Power" contains samples of "Could It Be Magic", written by Barry Manilow, as performed by Donna Summer.
 "Livin Wild" contains samples of "Why Me Baby?", written by Keith Sweat, Teddy Riley, and James Todd Smith, as performed by Keith Sweat featuring LL Cool J.
 "You & Me" contains samples of "They Don't Know", written by Tim Kelley, Bob Robinson, and Jonathan Buck, as performed by Jon B.; and samples from "Nice & Slow", written by Jermaine Dupri, Manuel Seal, Jr., Usher Raymond IV, and Brian Casey, as performed by Usher.

Personnel

 Joe LaPorta – mastering
 Ethan Stevens – mixing (1–3, 5–11, 13–18)
 Bainz – mixing (2, 4), recording (4), engineering assistance (16)
 Patrizio Pigliapoco – mixing (12), engineering (16)
 MixedbyAli – mixing (19)
 Aresh Banaji – mix engineering (4)
 Flo Ongonga – engineering
 Eric Manco – engineering (2, 12, 19)
 Taylor Moser – engineering (6)
 Joba Aladeselu – engineering (9)
 Mattazik Muzik – engineering (11)
 AJStayWorking – engineering (15)
 Nathaniel Alford – engineering (16)
 Chris Dennis – engineering (19)
 Braden Davies – mixing assistance (1, 3, 5–11, 13–18)
 Zack Acousta – mixing assistance (1, 3, 5–11, 13–18)
 Ashley Jackson – mixing assistance (12)
 Rosa Westfall – engineering assistance (1)
 Ernesto Carbo – engineering assistance (2)
 Rebekka Zeyfiyan – engineering assistance (2)
 Abel Wagner – engineering assistance (3, 5)
 Jim Bailey – engineering assistance (4, 18)
 Nick Poire – engineering assistance (4)
 Cameron Peterson – engineering assistance (5)
 Tanner Schmeidl – engineering assistance (6)
 Clive Coateston – engineering assistance (7)
 Jarred Barnville – engineering assistance (8)
 Raymund Sanchez Jr – engineering assistance (8)
 Paul Cho – engineering assistance (9)
 Seongho Kwak – engineering assistance (9)
 Teddrick Palmer – engineering assistance (10)
 Angie Randisi – engineering assistance (11)
 Emily Diaz – engineering assistance (12)
 Rodrigo Barahona – engineering assistance (12, 19)
 Ejaaz Collins – engineering assistance (13)
 Samuel Reyes – engineering assistance (13)
 Anand Joshi – engineering assistance (14)
 Anthony Williams – engineering assistance (15)
 ChanelGoinStupid – engineering assistance (17)
 Shaan Singh – engineering assistance (18)

Charts

Weekly charts

Year-end charts

References

2022 albums
Gunna (rapper) albums
Sequel albums
Albums produced by Allen Ritter
Albums produced by Wheezy
Albums produced by Bobby Raps
Albums produced by Metro Boomin
Albums produced by Mike Will Made It
Albums produced by Southside (record producer)
YSL Records albums